Xyphosia orientalis is a species of tephritid or fruit flies in the genus Xyphosia of the family Tephritidae.

Distribution
Poland, Ukraine, China.

References

Tephritinae
Insects described in 1936
Diptera of Asia
Diptera of Europe